Statistics of Swedish football Division 3 for the 1949–50 season.

League standings

Norra 1949–50

Östra 1949–50

Västra 1949–50

Södra 1949–50

Footnotes

References 

Swedish Football Division 3 seasons
3
Swed